Piedimonte Etneo (Sicilian: Piemunti) is a comune (municipality) in the Metropolitan City of Catania in the Italian region Sicily, located about  east of Palermo and about  northeast of Catania. 

Piedimonte Etneo borders the following municipalities: Calatabiano, Castiglione di Sicilia, Fiumefreddo di Sicilia, Linguaglossa, Mascali, Sant'Alfio.

References

External links
 Official website

Cities and towns in Sicily